also known as Fuse-Tenjinyama  Castle is the remains of a castle structure in Tottori (city), Tottori Prefecture, Japan. Its ruins have been protected as a Prefectural Historic Sites. The castle was the Shogosho (Shugo daimyo's residence or main bastion) of the Inaba Yamana clan.

The castle was built by Yamana Katutoyo in 1446. In 1573, Yamana Toyokuni moved Inaba Yamana clan's main bastion to Tottori castle. At the same time,   The keep of the castle was moved to Tottori castle.

References

Castles in Tottori Prefecture
Historic Sites of Japan
Former castles in Japan
Ruined castles in Japan